Kurusady St. Antony's Church, which is believed to be 400 years old, is near Nagercoil on the southern tip of India. It was said that a Hindu Nadar found a stone with a cross embossed on it. He had dreams and received orders from a form of light to build a church. Worship began in a humble manner and the place came to be called Curusadi ("Curusu" is the Tamil word for cross). Later on, after 21 years of construction, a new church came into being in 1911.

References 

Kanyakumari
Churches in Kanyakumari district